On 10 March 1997 a multiple-vehicle collision occurred on the M42 motorway near Bromsgrove, Worcestershire, in central England. Three people were killed and more than 60 others were injured in the crash, which happened in dense fog during the early morning rush hour.

The ensuing pile-up involved 160 vehicles on a  stretch of the motorway, including 30 on the opposite carriageway 20 minutes later.

Five air ambulances and 25 ambulances ferried injured drivers and passengers from the scene to three hospitals. Several cars and lorries were burnt to a shell and more than 30 occupants had to be cut free from their vehicles by firefighters.

Lisa Dodson, a 21-year-old student from Chaddesley Corbett, was the driver of the car, a Peugeot 205, struck by the tanker and she died from asphyxiation. Malcolm MacDonald, 53 and from Redditch, and 63-year-old Margaret Vining, from Gloucester, suffered fatal injuries in the pile-up.

Fairclough, then aged 46, suffered bleeding to the brain and leg injuries. In 1999, he was acquitted at Worcester Crown Court of causing death by dangerous driving but convicted of dangerous driving for his role in the collision. His driving licence was suspended for four years and he served three months in Hewell Grange prison. In November 2001 he successfully brought legal action to have the licence reinstated. A judge ordered him to take an extended driving test.

See also
1991 M4 motorway crash
2011 M5 motorway crash
2017 M1 motorway crash

References

Road incidents in England
M42 motorway crash
Transport in Worcestershire
History of Worcestershire
M42 motorway crash
M42 motorway crash
1990s in Worcestershire
Disasters in Worcestershire
M42 motorway crash